"Talkin' to Myself Again" is a song written by Jamie O'Hara, and recorded by American country music artist Tammy Wynette. It was released in November 1987 as the second single from the album Higher Ground.

Background and reception
"Talkin' to Myself gain" was recorded in March 1987 in Nashville, Tennessee. The recording session included additional tracks that would later appear on Wynette's 1987 album. Although not officially credited on the single release, it featured harmony vocals from The O'Kanes. The session included several other notable artists performing on background vocals as well. The session was produced by Steve Buckingham.

The song reached number 16 on the Billboard Hot Country Singles chart. "Talkin' to Myself Again" became Wynette's second single to become a major hit since 1985's "Sometimes When We Touch". It was released on her 1987 studio album Higher Ground.

Track listing
7" vinyl single
 "Talkin' to Myself Again" – 3:19
 "A Slow Burning Fire" – 3:05

Charts

References 

1987 songs
1987 singles
Tammy Wynette songs
Songs written by Jamie O'Hara (singer)
Song recordings produced by Steve Buckingham (record producer)
Epic Records singles